Ronald Brendan John "B. J." McBryde III (born October 21, 1991) is a former American football defensive end. He played college football at Connecticut. McBryde was signed by the Philadelphia Eagles as an undrafted free agent in 2015. He has also been a member of the Green Bay Packers and San Francisco 49ers.

Professional career

Philadelphia Eagles
After going undrafted in the 2015 NFL Draft, McBryde signed with the Philadelphia Eagles on May 2, 2015. On August 14, 2015, he was waived by the Eagles with a foot injury. After going unclaimed through waivers, McBryde was added to the Eagles injured reserve list on August 17, 2016. On October 21, 2015, he was waived from injured reserve.

Green Bay Packers
On November 18, 2015, McBryde was signed to the Green Bay Packers' practice squad. The Packers placed him on the practice squad injured list on January 5, 2016. On January 19, 2016, McBryde was re-signed by the Packers after the season ended. He was released by the Packers on July 25, 2016.

San Francisco 49ers
McBryde was signed by the San Francisco 49ers on July 29, 2016. On September 3, 2016, he was released by the 49ers during final team cuts.

References

External links
 San Francisco 49ers bio
 
 Philadelphia Eagles bio
 Connecticut Huskies bio
 

1991 births
Living people
Players of American football from Pennsylvania
People from Beaver Falls, Pennsylvania
American football defensive tackles
American football defensive ends
UConn Huskies football players
Philadelphia Eagles players
San Francisco 49ers players
Green Bay Packers players
Sportspeople from the Pittsburgh metropolitan area